Hans Jensen may refer to:

 Hans Jacob Arnold Jensen (1777–1853), Norwegian military officer and politician
 Hans G. Jensen (1856–1922), Norwegian trade unionist and politician
 Hans Johan Jensen (1882–?), Norwegian politician
 J. Hans D. Jensen (1907–1973), German nuclear physicist
 Hans Jensen (Norway) (1817–1888), Norwegian businessperson and politician
 Hans Arne Jensen, Danish botanist, agronomist and writer